David W. Craig, CD is a past commander of the Canadian Forces Naval Reserve. Entering his service in 1974, he served as a reserve officer for 41 years and retired in 2015.

Career
Craig's career started in 1974 with his posting at HMCS Discovery as a cadet. His posting coincided with his attending the University of British Columbia. He completed his Minor Warship Command qualification in 1984. He was promoted to commander in 1988 and served as the Executive Officer of HMCS Malahat. From 1992 to 1995, he was the ship's captain. After Malahat he served as Directing Staff in STAR II at the Canadian Forces College and PSU 4 Commander in Maritime Forces Pacific. In 1998, he was promoted to captain. He served as Western Region Coordinator for British Columbia, Alberta and Saskatchewan until 2004. In 2004, he was appointed Director of the Joint Command and Staff Course at the Canadian Forces College. In January 2011, he became a commodore and was appointed Commander of the Naval Reserve. He served from January 2011 to July 2015 in this position and retired from the Canadian Armed Forces in August 2015.

Civilian career
In 1978, Craig received a bachelor’s degree in Applied Science at the University of British Columbia. In 1982, Craig received a master's degree in Engineering from Carleton University and in 1988 he received a PhD in Computer Science. He has worked as Operational Research scientist at the Air Command Headquarters, and as Section Head of the Command, Control and Computer Section in Maritime Forces Pacific.

Awards and decorations
Craig's personal awards and decorations include the following:

References

Living people
Canadian admirals
Royal Canadian Navy officers
Year of birth missing (living people)